Laurence Joseph Walsh (1 August 1883 – 11 August 1962) was an Irish Fianna Fáil politician. A farmer and merchant, he was first elected to Dáil Éireann as a Fianna Fáil Teachta Dála (TD) for the Louth constituency at the 1937 general election. He was re-elected at the 1938 general election but lost his seat at the 1943 general election.

He regained his seat at the 1944 general election but was again defeated at the 1948 general election. He was once more re-elected at the 1951 general election but lost his seat again at the 1954 general election. In 1957 he was nominated by the Taoiseach to the 9th Seanad. 

Walsh was also Mayor of Drogheda, and a member of the Irish Volunteers, participating in the 1916 Easter Rising. He retired from politics in 1961.

References

1883 births
1962 deaths
Fianna Fáil TDs
Fianna Fáil senators
Members of the 9th Dáil
Members of the 10th Dáil
Members of the 12th Dáil
Members of the 14th Dáil
Members of the 9th Seanad
Politicians from County Louth
Irish farmers
Nominated members of Seanad Éireann